Milford Galleries are among New Zealand's leading dealer art galleries, with their headquarters in the city of Dunedin. There are two physical art spaces, in Dunedin and Queenstown, and there was also formerly a gallery in Auckland.

The galleries focus solely on New Zealand contemporary art (painting, photography, sculpture, and glassworks) and represent many of the country's leading artists, among them Graham Bennett, Joanna Braithwaite, Nigel Brown, Neil Dawson, Paul Dibble, Dick Frizzell, Darryn George, Jeffrey Harris, Michael Hight, Yuki Kihara, Andy Leleisi'uao, John Parker, J. S. Parker, Lisa Reihana, and Terry Stringer.

The galleries are run by the husband and wife team of Stephen Higginson and Niki Stewart.

Dunedin
Milford's main gallery space – the largest dealer gallery in Dunedin – has operated from the historic former Hallenstein Brothers clothing factory in Dowling Street, between Princes Street and Queens Gardens, since 1989. The gallery comprises three art spaces, and often has more than one exhibition in progress at any one time. New exhibitions are hosted every four weeks.

The gallery space also contains one of New Zealand's larger art store rooms, containing works by many of the artists represented by the gallery.

Queenstown
Milford's Queenstown gallery comprises two art spaces in a central Queenstown building in Earl Street. It has been operating since 2004.

Auckland
Milford Galleries opened an Auckland branch in 1999, and curated touring shows by New Zealand contemporary artists until 2009.

References

External links
Official website

Art galleries in New Zealand
Companies based in Dunedin
Art galleries established in 1989
1989 establishments in New Zealand
Art museums and galleries in Dunedin